The Hasenhorn is a mountain, in the Southern Black Forest in Germany. The mountain lies southeast of the little town of Todtnau.

In 2004, the old single chairlift on the Hasenhorn was removed and replaced by modern double chairlift. At the same time, an all-weather toboggan run (Rodelbahn) was built on the Hasenhorn, at the time the longest of its kind in Germany. The run is owned by an investor who also owns the Steinwasen Park. In addition, on the Hasenhorn there are suitable downhill runs and, in winter, a prepared toboggan run. In the vicinity of the chairlift's top station is a restaurant, the Berggasthaus Hasenhorn.

References

External links 
 Badische Seiten: Hasenhorn
 Todtnauer Ferienland: Ausflugsziele
 Hasenhorn Coasterbahn
 Lift databank Hasenhorn
 Description of the Hasenhorns at Badische Seiten.de

Mountains and hills of Baden-Württemberg
Mountains and hills of the Black Forest
Lörrach (district)
Baden
One-thousanders of Germany